Stav Lemkin (born 2 April 2003) is an Israeli professional footballer who plays as a center-back for Israeli Premier League club Hapoel Tel Aviv and both the Israel national under-19 team and the Israel national under-21 team.

International career 
He plays for both the Israel national under-19 team (2021 debut), and the Israel national under-21 team (2022 debut).

Career statistics

Club

External links 

 UEFA.com: 2022 Under-19 EURO Team of the Tournament, July 5, 2022

References

2003 births
Living people
Israeli footballers
Hapoel Tel Aviv F.C. players
Israeli Premier League players
Footballers from Tel Aviv
Israel youth international footballers
Association football defenders